Sohra Government College, established in 1982, is a general degree college situated at Sohra , in Meghalaya. This college is affiliated with the North Eastern Hill University.

Departments

Arts
Khasi
English
History
Education
Economics
Political Science

References

External links
http://sohragovernmentcollege.nic.in/index.html

Universities and colleges in Meghalaya
Colleges affiliated to North-Eastern Hill University
Educational institutions established in 1982
1982 establishments in Meghalaya